Joel Shatzky (November 30, 1943 – April 3, 2020) was an American writer and literary professor at the State University of New York.

Biography 
Shatzky, who grew up in the Bronx, attended High School of Music & Art. He studied at Queens College, obtained a master's degree from the University of Chicago in 1965 and a doctoral degree in dramatic literature from the New York University in 1970. From 1968 until his retirement in 2005, he taught at the State University of New York.

His play  It's a Clean, Well-lighted Place  was published in 1976 at the Theater des Londoner Institute of Contemporary Arts. The play  The Day They Traded Seaver  was performed in 1979 by  Soho Artists  under the direction of Dino Narrizano. Several one-act plays were then performed at the  Thirteenth Street Rep  and the  One Dream Theater . Other pieces have been produced in Philadelphia, San Francisco and at the Improv Theater in Los Angeles.

With his wife Dorothy, Shatzky wrote the book Facing Multiple Sclerosis: Our Longest Journey (1999). His novel Iago’s Tale was published in 2002. In cooperation with Michael Taub the standard works Contemporary Jewish-American Novelists (1997) and Contemporary Jewish-American Dramatists and Poets (1999) were written. The former was recognized by the magazine Choice as "Outstanding Book of 1997". His preoccupation with the history of the Holocaust led to the publication of the memories of the Holocaust survivors Susan Cernyak-Spatz ("Protective Custody Prisoner 34042") and Norbert Troller ("Theresienstadt: Hitler's "Gift" to the Jews).

Shatzky died from complications of COVID-19 on April 3, 2020.

Works 
 Hrsg.: Norbert Troller Theresienstadt: Hitler’s “Gift” to the Jews 1991
 with Michael Taub: Contemporary Jewish-American Novelists 1997
 with Michael Taub: Contemporary Jewish-American Dramatists and Poets 1999
 mit Dorothy Shatzky: Facing Multiple Sclerosis: Our Longest Journey, 1999
 mit Ellen Hill: The Thinking Crisis: The Disconnection of Teaching and Learning in Today’s Schools 2001
 Iago’s Tale: A Novel 2002
 Well of Evil (Young Adult Novel) 2004
 Common Sense: What America Must Do to Save Democracy (with a foreword by Stephen Bronner), 2004
 Hrsg.: Susan Cernyak-Spatz Protective Custody Prisoner 34042 2005
 with Joanne Napoli: Eternal Duet: The Story of Robert and Clara Schumann, 2005
 Option Three: A Novel about the University, 2005
 Intelligent Design: A Fable Science-Fiction-Roman 2007

References 

1943 births
2020 deaths
20th-century American male writers
21st-century American male writers
Literary scholars
People from Vancouver, Washington
State University of New York faculty
Deaths from the COVID-19 pandemic in New York (state)
Jewish American writers